Jack Stone was an American professional basketball player. He was selected with the 11th pick in the 1951 NBA Draft.

Kansas State
Stone played in the 1951 NCAA Division I men's basketball tournament. The team would lose to the eventual champion Kentucky Wildcats in the final game.

Baltimore Bullets
Stone was one of several players drafted by the Bullets in the 1951 NBA Draft.

References

Amateur Athletic Union men's basketball players
Baltimore Bullets (1944–1954) draft picks
Basketball players from Los Angeles
Guards (basketball)
Forwards (basketball)
Kansas State Wildcats men's basketball players
American men's basketball players